The Rue de la Ferronnerie is a street in the 1st arrondissement of Paris, in the Les Halles area.

History
 Before 1229 the name of the street was rue de la Charronnerie (ou des Charrons). The street had its current name in 1229.
 Henry IV of France was assassinated by Ravaillac on May 14, 1610 A marking on the street at no. 11 shows where the event took place.
 One of the longest buildings in Paris is located on  2-4-6-8-10-12-14 rue de la Ferronnerie. The building was constructed between  1669 and 1678.

References

External links
 Nomenclature officielle des voies de Paris
 Thierry Issartel, "Henri IV, les clés d'un règne", Gascogne Editing (Orthez), 2010.

Ferroniere